Prathiba Maninder Singh (born 20 July 1968) is a sitting judge of the Delhi High Court, in India. She has made significant contributions to academic literature and legal developments in Indian intellectual property law, as a practicing lawyer, and as an advisor to several legislative committees concerned with drafting related legislation.

Personal life 
Singh studied law at the University Law College in Bengaluru, Karnataka, and obtained an LL.M. from the University of Cambridge on a Cambridge Commonwealth Trust scholarship. In 2013, she established the Prathiba Singh Scholarship for LL.M candidates at the University of Cambridge, to provide financial support to Indian students who were studying for a Masters in Law.  

She is married to former Additional  Solicitor General of India,  Maninder Singh.

Career

Litigation 
Singh joined the bar in 1991 and practiced primarily in the field of intellectual property law, acting as the managing partner in a law firm. She was appointed by the Delhi High Court to consult with them to improve the functioning of the Copyright Office, and also consulted with a High Level Parliamentary Panel on streamlining the patent examination process in India. She has also provided expert advice to parliamentary committees on proposed amendments to intellectual property laws in India, including the Patents Act, and Copyright Amendment Act, 2012.  Singh was also a member of a panel that was constituted to draft India's National Intellectual Rights Policy in 2014.

In 2013, Singh notably represented Cipla against Novartis in Novartis v. Union of India & Others, in a case that established Cipla's right to produce generic versions of cancer medication patented by Novartis. The case was widely reported and is significant in intellectual property jurisprudence in India. In 2016, Singh represented the petitioners in a case filed against instant messaging service, WhatsApp, in which the Delhi High Court ordered WhatsApp to remove user information belonging to those who had deleted their WhatsApp accounts in anticipation of changes to WhatsApp's privacy policy.

Singh was appointed a senior counsel by the Delhi High Court in 2013.

In her capacity as the president of the Asian Patent Attorney Association, Singh had filed a writ petition in the Delhi High Court, challenging the limited amount of resources that were allocated to the Intellectual Property Appellate Board (IPAB), and following directions from the court in her petition, a permanent office for the IPAB was established in Delhi.

Judiciary 
Singh was appointed a permanent judge in the Delhi High Court on 15 May 2017. In 2019, Singh issued an order criticising the functioning of the Indian Intellectual Property Appellate Board, calling for reforms and restructuring.

References 

1968 births
Living people
Judges of the Delhi High Court
20th-century Indian lawyers
20th-century Indian women lawyers
21st-century Indian judges
21st-century Indian women judges